Santa Ifigenia Cemetery  (Spanish: Cementerio Santa Ifigenia) is a cemetery in Santiago de Cuba and resting place of a few notable Cubans.

The cemetery opened in 1868 to replace smaller Cemetery of Santa Ana.

The signature resting place is that of José Martí, whose mausoleum is guarded by three Cuban soldiers at the entrance. Cuban leader Fidel Castro's ashes are also buried at the cemetery.

The cemetery is reached by public transit from bus stops across Avenida Capitán Raúl Perozo. Parking is available for buses at the entrance of the cemetery.

Notable burials and memorials
 José Martí (d. 1895) – national hero
 Fidel Castro (d. 2016) – Leader of Cuba and revolutionary
 Carlos Manuel de Céspedes
 Dominga Moncada, General Guillermón Moncada’s mother
 Antonio Maceo – General of the Cuban Independence Army
 Facundo Bacardi – Founder of Bacardi
 Emilio Bacardi – son of the founder of Bacardi fortune Facundo Bacardi
 wife Elvira Cape de Bacardi
 Frank País (d. 1957) – Cuban revolutionary
 María Cabrales, Antonio Maceo’s wife
 Mariana Grajales, Maceos’ mother
 Nikolai Yavorsky (d. 1947) – Russian born choreographer
 Mario Garcia Menocal – Third President of Cuba
 Evaristo Estenoz – Leader of the 1912 Negro Rebellion
 Tomás Estrada Palma – First democratically elected Cuban president
 Compay Segundo – guitarist, singer, and composer
 Pantheon of the Dead for the Defense
 Pantheon to the Martyrs of Virginius
 Pantheon of the Revolution's Martyrs
 The Heroes' Altarpiece
 Tomb of Martyrs of San Juan de Wilson

See also 
 Che Guevara Mausoleum
 Lenin's Mausoleum
 Kremlin Wall Necropolis
 Ho Chi Minh Mausoleum
 Mai Dịch Cemetery
 Georgi Dimitrov Mausoleum
 Sükhbaatar's Mausoleum
 Altan-Ölgii National Cemetery
 National Monument in Vitkov
 Carol Park
 Mausoleum of Mao Zedong
 Babaoshan Revolutionary Cemetery
 Kumsusan Memorial Palace
 Revolutionary Martyrs' Cemetery
 Patriotic Martyrs' Cemetery
 Zentralfriedhof Friedrichsfelde
 National Martyrs Cemetery of Albania
 House of Flowers
 El Museo Histórico Militar de Caracas
 National Pantheon of Venezuela
 Powązki Military Cemetery
 Farkasréti Cemetery
 Kerepesi Cemetery

References

External links

 

Cemeteries in Cuba
1868 establishments in Cuba
19th-century architecture in Cuba